Rhinatrema bivittatum, the two-lined caecilian, is a species of caecilian in the family Rhinatrematidae. It is found in Brazil, French Guiana, Guyana, and Suriname. Its natural habitats are subtropical or tropical moist lowland forests, rivers, and intermittent rivers.

References

Rhinatrematidae
Amphibians of Brazil
Amphibians of French Guiana
Amphibians of Guyana
Amphibians of Suriname
Amphibians described in 1829